The Pan-Nigerian alphabet is a set of 33 Latin letters standardised by the National Language Centre of Nigeria in the 1980s. It is intended to be sufficient to write all the languages of Nigeria without using digraphs.

History
Several hundred different languages are spoken in Nigeria.  The different Latin alphabets made the use of typewriters impractical.  In the 1980s the National Language Centre (NLC) undertook to develop a single alphabet suitable for writing all the languages of the country and replacing use of Arabic script in some Nigerian languages that were proposed in the colonial era, taking as its starting point a model proposed by linguist Kay Williamson in 1981.  The font family was developed in 1985-86 by Edward Oguejofor and Victor Manfredi, in co-operation with the NLC, with technical assistance from Hermann Zapf.

Characters

If a Unicode font is installed with the Pan-Nigerian glyphs, then a table, such as the one below, should be seen:

The acute ( ´ ), grave ( ` ) and circumflex ( ˆ ) accents are also used to mark High, Low, and Falling tone respectively. Mid tone (in languages which contrast High, Mid, and Low) is left unmarked.

Keyboard 
The following typewriter keyboard was produced for the NLC by Olivetti:

On this  typewriter keyboard layout the letters Q and X were not mapped as they were not part of the alphabet, and digits 0 or 1 had to be entered as capital letters O and I. Keys in grey (for modern computers) were missing.

On modern keyboard for computers, the distinctive digits 0 and 1 are placed on the unshifted positions of keys of first row (like other digits), the letter Q is mapped like on standard QWERTY layouts, but dead keys at start of the first and second row need to be moved to the 102nd key on start of the first row (reducing the width of the left shift key), and to the shifted position of the new key assigned to digit 0 on the first row.

In all cases, the Enter key may vary between this L-shaped  key on two rows, and the horizontal key on the third row only (moving the key assigned to  letter Ǝ to the end of the second row).

Mobile devices 
Some onscreen smartphone keyboards like Swiftkey, Touchpal, Multiling and African keyboards have full support for Pan-Nigerian alphabets.

See also
General Alphabet of Cameroon Languages
Africa Alphabet
African reference alphabet
Dinka alphabet
ISO 6438
Standard Alphabet by Lepsius
Vietnamese alphabet

Notes and references 

Latin alphabets
Writing systems of Africa

Multilingual orthographies
Keyboard layouts
Writing systems introduced in 1985